Samsung Slash was a cell phone made by Samsung for prepaid customers on the Virgin Mobile network in the USA.  The phone has a slider form factor and was released in 2008.

Features
Other features include:
32MB of memory shared between pictures, applications, games and ring tones
Bluetooth
Full-color screen
Mobile Web
Speakerphone
499 contact entries
Spanish-language user interface for Spanish-speaking customers
Paid content portal called VirginXL to buy various user interface customizations
Text messaging
Voice dialing

Reviews
Reaction to the phone differed.  Info Sync World said the phone had "a low-end feel", giving it a score of 35%.  CNet scored it 3/5 (meaning "good") and said "The Samsung Slash is a decent entry-level phone with a few extra features that put it just above a basic handset."

References

External links
Entry on PhoneArena
Entry on About.com
Review on ZDNet
Virgin Mobile

Samsung mobile phones
Mobile phones introduced in 2008